The Mrs. Charles Francis Adams Trophy, or Adams Cup for short, was the competition for the United States Women's Sailing Championship. The donor of the award was Francis Lovering Adams the wife of Charles Francis Adams III, former Secretary to the Navy and skipper of the 1920 America's Cup winner Resolute. It had its origins in the 1924 Hodder Cup. The Adams Cup was raced annually until 2011. Now retired, the Mrs. Charles Francis Adams Trophy is on display in the Reading Room of the Tom Morris Library at the National Sailing Hall of Fame.

History

Ruth Sears was the first winner of the cup followed by Lorna Whittelsley. In 1933, the competition gave birth to the Women's National Yacht Racing Association. That organization was later headed by Adams Cup winner  "Leggie" Mertz.

In a sport with hundreds of different classes of boats and a national champion for each, the point of the Adams Cup was to determine an overall champion for the sport of women's sailing in the United States. First run by the Women's National Yacht Racing Association, and later organized by the U.S. Sailing Association, eliminations were held throughout the country, and the finals were raced in a different type of boat each year to eliminate any advantage a sailor from any particular class might otherwise have. Competitors sailed boats provided by the host club, and teams were required to race each boat at the event once so that nobody would have an advantage in terms of equipment, similar to high school and collegiate sailing.

As with national championships in other sports, the top three finishers received gold, silver and bronze medals, respectively. The winner likewise held the Mrs. Charles Francis Adams Cup itself until the following year's champion was crowned.

Sailors from Cohasset Yacht Club won the prize first and the most number of time (9) followed by American Yacht Club who won it eight times.

Legacy
Today, the United States Adult Sailing Championship, is open to both men and women but people still remember the Adams Cup. In 2016, Gary Jobson, then President of the National Sailing Hall of Fame, commented on the important history of the cup, “The Adams Cup inspired generations of women to participate and excel in the sport of sailboat racing. Collecting and preserving this legacy will keep that history alive.”

Adams Cup Champions
List of champions:

References

External links
https://www.ussailing.org/

Women's sailing competitions
United States Sailing Championships
Sailing